(1921-2005) was a Brazilian nurse, born in .

 is notable for being the first woman to serve in the Brazilian Expeditionary Force Nursing Corps during World War II. In this sense,  was part of the first female group in the Brazilian Army.

On August 4, 1944, she embarked for Naples, returning to Brazil on October 3, 1945, on the James Parker ship. During her time on the Italian front,  served in several blood hospitals of the United States Army.

References

1921 births
2005 deaths
Brazilian military nurses
Brazil in World War II
Women in World War II
People from São Paulo (state)
Brazilian expatriates in Italy
Female wartime nurses